All View is a historic, 28 room estate home located on the Long Island Sound shore in the gated, Premium Point community of New Rochelle, in Westchester County, New York. Although real estate advertisements have listed the architect as Stanford White, the actual designer was Sidney Vanuxem Stratton, who maintained an office in the same building as McKim, Mead & White. It sits on 2.82 acres at the end of the Premium Point peninsula overlooking New Rochelle's upper most harbor, Echo Bay.

The 21,306 square foot home has eight bedrooms, 12 bathrooms, and a six car garage. The grounds were designed by landscape architect Frederick Law Olmsted, creator of New York's Central Park.

Architecture
The home is on a bluff at the end of a rocky, angled stretch of the Premium Point Peninsula. The serene and peaceful site immediately adjacent to Echo Island borders Premium Mill-Pond, Echo Bay and Long Island Sound. The front of the home has a recessed center with lightly projecting wings. The corners of these wings are supported by immense columns and lead to the top of the main cornice. The uppermost story is treated as an attic in the wings giving space for a window and creating an impressive silhouette for the rest. Pilasters complete the feature of the wings, and while the windows enclosed within them are plainly framed in the white marble and encased in solid brick.

The entrance in the center is a unique structure made of white marble completely occupied by the ground floor and the story above it The round arched opening pilasters and the terrace of the roof is enclosed within a balustrade. The rectangular side porch, and two beautifully executed upper stories, are treated as window galleries; two on each side of the porch and eight beautifully glazed windows in the upper story.

History
The expansive brick home was built in the late 1800s for Charles Oliver Iselin, son of wealthy Wall Street financier and railroad magnate Adrian G Iselin. C. Oliver was one of the most famous yachtsmen of the time and a five-time defender of the America's cup. He built a breakwater in Echo Bay so that he could safely dock his yachts including the Vigilant, Defender and Columbia next to his home. Iselin's second wife Hope Goddard Iselin was the first woman to serve as part of the crew on an America's Cup yacht. Iselin hosted many of the most prominent members of society at the home including the Vanderbilts and Morgans, as well as dignitaries and royalty.

References

Buildings and structures in New Rochelle, New York
Houses in Westchester County, New York
Long Island Sound
Residential buildings completed in 1890
1890 establishments in New York (state)